Craobh Rua Camlocha (CRC) is a Gaelic Athletic Association (GAA) club located in Bessbrook, County Armagh, Northern Ireland. The club is solely concerned with the game of hurling.

History

Craobh Rua Camlocha hurling club was established after a meeting of its founding members was held in Doyles pub Camlough in 1991. It was set up to help reintroduce hurling in the Camlough and Bessbrook areas of South Armagh. The clubs members now come from all around South Armagh including but not limited to Belleeks, Whitecross, Crossmaglen, Lislea and Mullaghbawn. The club was over 20 years in existence when it won its first Armagh JHC title in 2013. Craobh Rua have since added to their championship title tally.

In 2021/2022 Craobh Rua had their most successful year, they won their third-ever Armagh junior title against Cuchulainn II team. This was also the clubs first time winning the Armagh title two years in a row. In this year they also won the Ulster Junior Hurling Championship beating the Monaghan club Carrickmacross in the final. 

This is significant as it is the first team from County Armagh to win a junior hurling title in Ulster. The season came to a halt in Birmingham at the home of Warwickshire GAA when they lost in penalties (1–2) after extra time to Fullen Gaels in the quarter-finals of the All-Ireland.

Honours

Senior Level
Ulster Junior Club Hurling Championship: 
2021
Armagh Junior Hurling Championship: 
2013, 2020, 2021

Under 16
Armagh Hurling Championship: 
2016

Under 14
Armagh Hurling Championship: 
2010

Under 12
Armagh Hurling Championship: 
2008

Notable players
The following Craobh Rua players have lined out with the Armagh senior hurling team:
Fiachra Bradley
Micheal Garvey
Ryan Lewis
Ryan Lundy
Tiernan O'Hare
Stephen O'Keeffe
Oisin O'Hare
Sean Watters
Caolan Rowntree

References

Gaelic games clubs in County Armagh
Hurling clubs in County Armagh